The Muddy Branch Greenway Trail is a  long natural surface trail that runs from the Potomac River to Darnestown Road in Montgomery County, MD. The trail runs near the course of Muddy Branch, a tributary stream of the Potomac River that originates in Gaithersburg, Maryland.

The trail starts at Pennyfield Lock Road near the C&O Canal's Pennyfield Lock, Crosses Muddy Branch and runs through Blockhouse Point Conservation Park, across River Road and on to Esworthy Road.  From there, the trail crosses the road and enters Muddy Branch Stream Valley Park and continues in the park until the end at Darnestown Road

References 

Hiking trails in Maryland
Protected areas of Montgomery County, Maryland